Bistrishko Branishte is a nature reserve in the Vitosha Nature Park on Vitosha Mountain in Bulgaria.

It was established in 1934, together with Vitosha Nature Park. Since 1977 it has been a biosphere reserve under the Man and the Biosphere (MAB) Programme of UNESCO.

The reserve comprises the eastern slopes of the peaks of Golyam Rezen (2277 m), Malak Rezen (2191 m) and Skoparnik (2226 m), the northern slopes of Golyam Kupen Peak (1930 m), the upper valleys of Vitoshka Bistritsa and Yanchevska rivers. Its surface area is 1061.6 ha, the elevation is between 1430 and 2277 m.

Over 50 % of its territory is covered by forest (predominantly spruce), 100 to 120 years old on the average. There are several stone runs in the Subalpine zone, penetrating the forest. The larger animals found in the reserve include deer, boar, wolf, bear.

Bistrishko Branishte attracts many tourists from the adjacent Aleko Centre situated off the northwestern border of the reserve. Visitors are not permitted to stray away from the few designated tracks linking the Vitosha's highest peak of Cherni Vrah, Aleko area, Bistritsa village (3 tracks running via Pogledets site and along Bistritsa and Yanchevska rivers), Zheleznitsa village.

See also

 World Network of Biosphere Reserves
 List of biosphere reserves in Bulgaria
 Torfeno Branishte
 Golyamata Gramada

References
 Virgin Forests of Bulgaria: 6. Virgin forests in Vitosha Mountain → 6.4. Virgin forest, p. 44
 Climbing Guide: Vitosha
 Vitosha Nature Park

Protected areas established in 1934
1934 establishments in Bulgaria
Biosphere reserves of Bulgaria
Nature reserves in Bulgaria
Vitosha
Geography of Sofia City Province
Geography of Pernik Province
Geography of Sofia Province